Millhouse Capital is a British registered company. It was created in 2001 to manage assets owned by the Russian businessman Roman Abramovich and his partners.

Overview 
The chairman of the company is Russian-American businessman Eugene Shvidler. Its assets under management included major stakes in oil company Sibneft (now Gazprom Neft), Russian Aluminum, Aeroflot, and RusPromAvto, as well as investments in electricity, pulp and paper processing, insurance and banking.

The company controls the Prodo agricultural group, which it took over in 2003.

Holdings 
Millhouse Capital's shareholders sold their 26 percent holding in OAO Aeroflot in 2003 and a 50 percent stake in OAO Russian Aluminum (UC RUSAL), now the world's largest aluminum producer, in two deals spanning 2003 and 2004. The sale prices were not disclosed.

In October 2005, Millhouse Capital sold a 72% stake in Sibneft to Gazprom for more than US$13 billion.

Millhouse Capital was initially based at Abbey House in Weybridge, a large two storey office building on the edge of the St. George's Hill estate, before moving to Stamford Bridge following Abramovich's acquisition of Chelsea Football Club in 2003. It had a larger representative office in Moscow.

In a reorganization following the sale of Sibneft, the Moscow office of Millhouse Capital was closed and a new company, Moscow-based Millhouse LLC, was formed in April 2006 to manage the assets of  Abramovich and his partners. The London office of Millhouse Capital was closed in August 2008 and its functions rolled into a new firm, MHC (Services) Ltd.

References

Companies based in the London Borough of Hammersmith and Fulham
Financial services companies established in 2001
Roman Abramovich